This is an (incomplete) list of electronic games released by VTech, along with their format and date of release, if known. See lists of video games for related lists.
Starting in the early 1980s, VTech launched a series of portable and table top games that made use of LCD, VFD and LED displays. One brand used by VTech, the Time & Fun series, seems to be an attempt to cash on the electronic handheld craze started by the Game & Watch series.

Some of VTech's games were distributed in the US by Palmtex under their name, like the Tri-Screen Time & Fun series.

Models

References

 
Handheld electronic games